Nora Foss al-Jabri (born 29 January 1996 in Gjøvik, Norway) is a Norwegian singer.

Beginnings
She was born to an Iraqi father and an ethnic Norwegian mother. She started singing when she was eight years old and took singing lessons regularly.

She became known in Norway because of her version of Leonard Cohen's "Hallelujah". At first it got some radio play but the big success came after her sister posted a video in a singing contest on the Norwegian video site "snutter10". The video became popular, getting her more attention. She has since appeared on numerous television shows and concerts.

She also sang three songs on Norwegian children's music band Lyriaka's album called Lyriaka i jungelen.

In Norske Talenter (2008)
She participated in the talent show Norske Talenter in 2008. After she sang "Somewhere Over the Rainbow", the judges described her as talented and technically skilled singer, who sounded older than her age. She finished third in the competition.

As a result, on 18 May 2009, Nora was featured on Oprah Winfrey's "World's Most Talented Kids" Finale Episode. She sang "Over the Rainbow".

In Melodi Grand Prix (2012)
She took part in 2012 Melodi Grand Prix in a bid to represent Norway in the 2012 Eurovision Song Contest in Baku with the song "Somewhere Beautiful", where she finished in 2nd place.

Discography

Albums
2011: Nora Foss al-Jabri

Singles
2012: "Somewhere Beautiful"

References

External links
 

1996 births
Got Talent contestants
Living people
Norwegian child singers
English-language singers from Norway
Melodi Grand Prix contestants
Norwegian people of Iraqi descent

Norske Talenter
Musicians from Gjøvik
21st-century Norwegian singers
21st-century Norwegian women singers